Wien Heiligenstadt (German for Vienna Heiligenstadt) is a railway station located in the Döbling district of Vienna, Austria.  Opened in 1898, it is owned and operated by the Austrian Federal Railways (ÖBB), and is served by regional and S-Bahn trains.

Station and adjoining goods depot was bombed on 30 March 1944 by the 15th AF.

References

External links 

Heiligenstadt
Buildings and structures in Döbling
Railway stations opened in 1898
Otto Wagner buildings
Art Nouveau architecture in Vienna
Art Nouveau railway stations
1898 establishments in Austria
Railway stations in Austria opened in the 19th century